Lisa Schrage (born March 2, 1963) is a retired Canadian film and television actress. She is best known for her role as Mary Lou Maloney in the 1987 Canadian horror film Hello Mary Lou: Prom Night II.

Life
She is married to Chilean Director Jorge Montesi.

Filmography
Young Again (1995) - Girl #1 (at disco)
China White (1989) - Anne Michaels
Food of the Gods II (1989) - Alex Reed
Hello Mary Lou: Prom Night II (1987) - Mary Lou Maloney
Dreams Beyond Memory (1987) - Jennifer
The Amateur (1981) - Teenage Girl #1

Television
Shadow Warriors II: Hunt for the Death Merchant a.k.a. Assault on Death Mountain (1999) - Laura Berringer
Sweet Deception (1998) - Eva Newcomb
The Sentinel (1998) - 1 episode, Kelly Temple
Sweating Bullets a.k.a. "Tropical Heat" (1992) - 1 episode, Lisa McGrath
The Twilight Zone (1988) - 1 episode, Candy
Night Heat (1987-1988) - 3 episodes, Victoria / Ellen Kozak / Terry Garfield
Alfred Hitchcock Presents (1988) - 1 episode, Kelly
Shades of Love: Indigo Autumn (1987) - Jill Jamieson (as Lisa Schrag)

References

External links

1956 births
Living people
Canadian film actresses
Canadian television actresses